Loïc Baal (born 28 January 1992) is a professional footballer who plays as a defensive midfielder for  club Le Puy. Born in metropolitan France, he plays for the French Guiana national team.

Club career 
Baal has previously played for Le Mans, where he made two appearances in Ligue 2, and Mulhouse. He joined Créteil in July 2018.

International career 
Baal has played international football with French Guiana, making his debut on 25 March 2015 in a 3–1 win over Honduras in the qualifying tournament for the 2015 Gold Cup.

Personal life 
Baal is the younger brother of fellow professional footballer Ludovic Baal.

Career statistics

International goals
Scores and results list French Guiana's goal tally first.

Honours 
Le Puy

 Championnat National 2: 2021–22

References

External links
 Loïc Baal at foot-national.com
 
 
 

1992 births
Living people
French Guianan footballers
French Guiana international footballers
French footballers
French people of French Guianan descent
Black French sportspeople
Association football midfielders
Le Mans FC players
FC Mulhouse players
ASM Belfort players
US Créteil-Lusitanos players
Le Puy Foot 43 Auvergne players
Ligue 2 players
Championnat National players
Championnat National 2 players
Championnat National 3 players
2017 CONCACAF Gold Cup players